RT-Thread is an open-source real-time operating system (RTOS) for embedded systems and Internet of things (IoT). It is developed by the RT-Thread Development Team based in China. RT-Thread is aimed to change the current situation in China that there is no well used open-source real-time operating system in the microcontroller field. 

, RT-Thread was reported to be #3 on the list of RTOSes with the largest number of contributors (behind Zephyr and Mbed).

Variants
In 2006, RT-Thread began as an open-source real-time operating system (RTOS) that is mainly written in the programming language C. In 2017, a second variant was released for resource-constrained microcontrollers; it needs a minimum of 3 kB flash memory or read-only memory (ROM) and 1.2 kB random-access memory (RAM). Also, RT-Thread's first variant was named Standard, and second variant was named Nano.

See also
 Embedded system
 Microcontroller
 Single-board microcontroller

References

External links
 , Chinese
 
 gitee repository

Real-time operating systems
Embedded operating systems
ARM operating systems